R90 may refer to:
 ECE Regulation 90, concerning vehicle brake linings
 , a destroyer of the Royal Navy
 Romano R.90, a prototype French fighter aircraft
 Ruschmeyer R 90, a German civil utility aircraft
 Toyota Noah (R90), a minivan